Ametista was the lead ship of her class of a dozen submarines, the second sub-class of the 600 Series of coastal submarines built for the  (Royal Italian Navy) during the early 1930s.

Design and description
The Sirena class was an improved and enlarged version of the preceding s. They displaced  surfaced and  submerged. Their crew numbered 45 officers and enlisted men.

For surface running, the boats were powered by two  diesel engines, each driving one propeller shaft. When submerged each propeller was driven by a  electric motor. They could reach  on the surface and  underwater.

The boats were armed with six  torpedo tubes, four in the bow and two in the stern for which they carried a total of 12 torpedoes. They were also armed with a single  deck gun forward of the conning tower for combat on the surface. Their anti-aircraft armament consisted of two or four  machine guns.

Construction and career
Ametista was laid down by Odero-Terni-Orlando (OTO) at their Muggiano, La Spezia shipyard in 1931, launched on 24 April 1933 and completed the following year.

Notes

References
 
 

uboat.net Ametista (AA) Ametista Accessed 1 May 2022

External links
 Sommergibili Marina Militare website

Sirena-class submarines
World War II submarines of Italy
1933 ships
Ships built in La Spezia
Ships built by OTO Melara
Maritime incidents in September 1943
Scuttled vessels
Lost submarines of Italy